Hopea kerangasensis is a species of plant in the family Dipterocarpaceae. It is found in Sumatra, Peninsular Malaysia and Borneo.

References

kerangasensis
Trees of Borneo
Trees of Sumatra
Trees of Peninsular Malaysia
Critically endangered flora of Asia
Taxonomy articles created by Polbot